Leslie N. Love (born July 8, 1971) is a Democratic former member of the Michigan House of Representatives, who represented the 10th District—which encompasses parts of northwest Detroit and Redford Township. She served in this position from 2014 to 2020.

Education
Love attended Detroit Public Schools and graduated from Thomas M. Cooley High School. She received a bachelor's degree from Siena Heights University and master's degrees from Marygrove College and Wayne State University. She lives in Detroit.

Professional life
Love previously worked as the director of theater operations at Marygrove College and served as an adjunct professor for Marygrove College and the Wayne County Community College District.

In 1998, she worked as the campaign assistant for California Assemblywoman Marguerite Archie-Hudson and for California Governor Gray Davis as a field organizer.

References

External links
 
 Re-election Site
 Leslie Love at ballotpedia.org

1971 births
Living people
Democratic Party members of the Michigan House of Representatives
Politicians from Detroit
African-American state legislators in Michigan
African-American women in politics
Siena Heights University alumni
Marygrove College alumni
Wayne State University alumni
Women state legislators in Michigan
21st-century American politicians
21st-century American women politicians
21st-century African-American women
21st-century African-American politicians
20th-century African-American people
20th-century African-American women